Zakhmi Sipahi is a 1995 Indian Hindi-language film directed by T L V Prasad, starring Mithun Chakraborty, Om Puri, Rituparna Sengupta  and Puneet Issar.

Plot
An honest officer is forced to deliver a wrong verdict, spiralling his reputation & so commits suicide; his wife subsequently becomes mad. His son takes it upon him to bring the perpetuators to justice. A 3-way classic combo of Chakraborty, TLV Prasad & KC Bokadia.

Cast
Mithun Chakraborty as D.H.C.P. Shakti
Om Puri as Om Chaudhary
Rituparna Sengupta inpecstor Manjulah  
Vani Viswanath
Vikas Anand as Com. Gautam Gorakhnath
Puneet Issar as Chhota Chaudhary
Goga Kapoor as S.P. Amar Sharma
Kunika as Cameo, in song "O Chaila"
Ram Mohan as C.M.
Dina Pathak as Shakti's Grandmother
Jagdish Raj as Inspector
Mahavir Shah as Rajesh (son of a M.L.A)
Tiku Talsania as Priya's Brother

Music
"NakhreWali Ghar Se Nikli"  — Abhijeet
"Hothon Se Chahat Ka Izhar" - Sadhana Sargam, Abhijeet
"Lips To Lips"  — Sapna Mukherjee, Abhijeet
"Tum Sharma Ke Dekho"  — Sadhana Sargam, Kumar Sanu
"O Laila O Laila"  — Shabbir Kumar, Sapna Mukherjee, Ila Arun 
"Mere Yaar Pe Jawani"  — Shabbir Kumar, Poornima
"Kudi Pataka"  — Ila Arun

References

External links
 

1992 films
1990s Hindi-language films
Mithun's Dream Factory films
Films shot in Ooty
Films directed by T. L. V. Prasad